Angel Blood is the debut studio album released by Australian pop group, Leonardo's Bride. The album peaked at number 25 on the ARIA Charts and was certified gold.

At the ARIA Music Awards of 1997, the album was nominated for ARIA Award for Breakthrough Artist – Album and ARIA Award for Best Cover Art.

Track listing
 "Even When I'm Sleeping" - 3:52
 "Buzz" - 2:56
 "So Brand New" - 4:24
 "Kissing Bedrock" - 3:12
 "Stay" - 3:19
 "Hey Hey" - 3:56
 "Forty-One False Starts" - 3:30
 "Titanic" - 4:08
 "Problematic Art of Conversation" - 3:46
 "Fall" - 5:19
 "Wednesday" - 4:00
 "Buddha Baby" - 4:00

Charts

Weekly charts

Year-end charts

Certifications

Release history

References

1997 debut albums
Mushroom Records albums
Albums produced by Justin Stanley